The National Independent Party  was a small Irish political grouping founded in response to the events of the Post-2008 Irish economic downturn. The party registered with the Oireachtas in January 2014. Party policies included a citizen's charter, leaving the euro if Ireland so wishes, removal of fluoride from drinking water, managing inward immigration, reducing the number of political representatives, reform of the Dail and Seanad, and general electoral reform.

As of July 2018, the NIP appears was defunct; it was no longer listed on the register of current political parties.

References

External links
 

Post-2008 Irish economic downturn
2014 establishments in Ireland
Political organisations based in the Republic of Ireland
2018 disestablishments in Ireland